Ectoedemia cerviparadisicola is a moth of the family Nepticulidae. It is found in central Japan.

The larvae feed on Quercus gilva. They probably mine the leaves of their host plant.

References

Moths described in 2012
Nepticulidae
Moths of Japan